Elizabeth of Lorraine-Vaudémont, Countess of Nassau-Saarbrücken (also known as Isabella of Lotharingen;  in Lorraine – 17 January 1456 in Saarbrücken) was a pioneer of the novel in Early New High German language.  Around 1437, she translated and edited four French romances by Odo Arpin of Bourges, Sibille, Loher & Maller and Hug Chapler.

Life 
Elizabeth was the daughter of Frederick of Lorraine (1368-1415) and Margaret of Joinville ( – 1418).  In 1412, she became the second wife of Count Philip I of Nassau-Weilburg-Saarbrücken (1368-1429). After his death in 1429 to 1438 she took over the regency for her infant son, Philip II (1418-1492) of the Nassau-Saarbrücken territory, the areas along the middle Saar, along the Blies, in eastern Lorraine, in today's Donnersbergkreis, around the city of Kirchheimbolanden, in the Taunus area, along the Lahn as well as Commercy in Lorraine on the Meuse.  She managed to keep her possessions together and to avoid disputes with her many neighbours.  During her rule, Saarbrücken was developed into a residence town.  She resided at Saarbrücken Castle on the Castle Rock with its steep slope towards the Saar.  Until then, the territory had had no centralized administration, and its rulers had travelled constantly between their scattered possessions, in order to maintain their claim to power by being physically present some of the time in each and every possession ("rule by travelling around").

Elisabeth died on 17 January 1456.  Contrary to the customs of the ancient Counts of Saarbrücken, who were buried in Wadgassen, Elisabeth chose to be buried in the Collegiate Church in Sankt Arnual, which is now part of Saarbrücken.  For the next 200 years, all Counts of Nassau-Saarbrücken would be buried here.

Legacy 
Elisabeth took care of her inheritance during her lifetime.  In 1439, she divided her possessions among her two sons.  The elder son, Philip II received the territories on the right bank of the Rhine; the younger son, John II received the territories on the left bank.  Apparently John II, unlike his brother, was interested in his mother's literary activities.  Among other things, he had magnificent manuscripts made of the novels his mother had translated  These manuscripts and early printed copies are now held by the Herzog August Library in Wolfenbüttel and the State and University Library in Hamburg.

In April 2007, a large poster exhibition of Elisabeth's novels was held in Saarbrücken, in the framework of the city's participation in the activities of Luxembourg as Cultural Capital of Europe.  A European Writers' Congress in Saarbrücken on 16 October 2007 had as its motto , with which Elisabeth began her translations.

Marriage and issue 
Elisabeth was the second wife of Count Philip I of Nassau-Weilburg-Saarbrücken (1368-1429) and had the following children with him:
 Philip II of Nassau-Weilburg
 John II of Nassau-Saarbrücken
 Johannetta (d. 1 February 1481, Römhild), married on 22 June 1422 to Count George I of Henneberg
 Margarete (26 April 1426 – 5 May 1490), married in 1441 to Gerhard of Rodemachern

References 
 
 
 Bernhard Burchert: Die Anfänge des Prosaromans in Deutschland. Die Prosaerzählungen Elisabeths von Nassau-Saarbrücken, Lang, Frankfurt, Bern and New York, 1987 
 Thomas Cramer: Geschichte der deutschen Literatur im späten Mittelalter, dtv, Munich, 2000, 
 Wolfgang Haubrichs, Hans-Walter Herrmann and Gerhard Sauder (eds.): Zwischen Deutschland und Frankreich. Elisabeth von Lothringen, Gräfin von Nassau-Saarbrücken, in the series Veröffentlichungen der Kommission für Saarländische Landesgeschichte und Volksforschung, vol. 34, St. Ingbert: Universitäts-Verlag, Röhrig, 2002, 
 Ulricke qnd Manfred Jacobs: Die Grenzgängerin Elisabeth von Lothringen, Gollenstein, Blieskastel 2007, 
 Yvonne Rech and Hans-Walter Herrmann: Elisabethenwege. Reisen auf den Wegen einer bedeutenden Frau. [Ein Reiseführer]. Regionalverband Saarbrücken, Saarbrücken, 2008
 Kerstin Joost-Schäfer: Die dichtende Gräfin — Elisabeth von Lothringen, in: Saarbrücker Zeitung, section Momente, 13/14 March 2010, p. E 8 (special page)

External links 
 
 Literature by Elisabeth
 Literature about Elisabeth
 Elisabeth in the State and university Library in Hamburg
 Elisabeth in the Saarländische Biografien

German translators
Writers from Saarland
House of Lorraine
1395 births
1456 deaths
Countesses of Nassau
Year of birth uncertain
15th-century German people
15th-century German women
German women novelists
Burials at Stiftskirche Sankt Arnual (Saarbrücken)